The Awakening may refer to:

Religion
 Awakening (Finnish religious movement), a Lutheran movement in Finland
 Great Awakening, several periods of Anglo-American Christian revival

Film and television

Film
 The Awakening, a 1913 film starring Charlotte Burton
 The Awakening (1917 film), an American silent film directed by George Archainbaud
 The Awakening (1928 film), an American silent film directed by Victor Fleming
 The Awakening (1954 film), an American television short film starring Buster Keaton
 The Awakening (1956 film), an Italian comedy drama film
 The Awakening (1980 film), a British horror film directed by Mike Newell
 The Awakening, a 1995 television film starring Sheila McCarthy
 The Awakening (2006 film), a Bollywood documentary
 Species: The Awakening, a 2007 American science fiction thriller film
 The Awakening (2011 film), a British supernatural drama film

Television
 The Awakening (TV series), a 1984 two-part Singaporean drama series
 The Awakening (Doctor Who), a 1984 Doctor Who serial

Episodes
 "The Awakening" (Avatar: The Last Airbender)
 "The Awakening" (Defiance)
 "The Awakening" (Masters of Science Fiction)
 "The Awakening" (Spider-Man)

Literature
 The Awakening (Armstrong novel), a 2009 Darkest Powers novel by Kelley Armstrong
 The Awakening (Carroll novel) or The Quantum Prophecy, a 2006 novel by Michael Carroll
 The Awakening (Chopin novel), an 1899 novel by Kate Chopin
 The Awakening (Smith novel), a 1991 Vampire Diaries novel by L. J. Smith
 "The Awakening" (short story), a 1942 story by Arthur C. Clarke
 The Awakening, the third and final arc of the Ben Drowned series by Alexander D. Hall

Music
 The Awakening (band), a musical project of Ashton Nyte

Albums
 The Awakening (Ahmad Jamal album) or the title song, 1970
 The Awakening (Billy Harper album) or the title song, 1979
 The Awakening (Caliban album) or the title song, 2007
 The Awakening (James Morrison album) or the title song, 2011
 The Awakening (Kamelot album), 2023
 The Awakening (Lord Finesse album), 1996
 The Awakening (Melissa Etheridge album) or the three-song title work, 2007
 The Awakening (Merciless album) or the title song, 1990
 The Awakening (Nekropolis album) or the title song, 1997
 The Awakening (The Pharaohs album), 1971
 The Awakening (PMD album) or the title song, 2003
 The Awakening (P.O.D. album) or the title song, 2015
 The Awakening (Send More Paramedics album), 2006
 The Awakening (EP), by GFriend, 2017
 The Awakening, by the Red Jumpsuit Apparatus, 2018
 The Awakening, by the Reddings, or the title song, 1980

Songs
 "The Awakening", by Alice Cooper from Welcome to My Nightmare, 1975
 "The Awakening", by Edison's Children, 2011
 "The Awakening", by Godsmack from Faceless, 2003
 "The Awakening", by Hawkwind from Space Ritual, 1973
 "The Awakening", by Lovebites from Awakening from Abyss, 2017
 "The Awakening", by Narada Michael Walden from Awakening, 1979
 "The Awakening", by Narnia from Awakening, 1998
 "The Awakening", by York, 1998
 "The Awakening", a piece of library music composed by Johnny Pearson and used as theme music by ITV

Other uses
 The Awakening (sculpture), a 1980 sculpture by J. Seward Johnson Jr.

See also
 Awakening (disambiguation)
 Awake (disambiguation)
 Awaken (disambiguation)
 Enlightenment (spiritual)
 National awakening (disambiguation)
 Romantic nationalism